Dickey is a city in LaMoure County, North Dakota, United States. The population was 42 at the 2020 census.

History
Dickey was founded in 1885. George H. Dickey is the town's namesake.

Geography
Dickey is located at  (46.536315, -98.469659).

Demographics

2010 census
As of the census of 2010, there were 42 people, 20 households, and 10 families residing in the city. The racial makeup of the city was 100.0% White.

There were 20 households, of which 10.0% had children under the age of 18 living with them, 35.0% were married couples living together, 10.0% had a female householder with no husband present, 5.0% had a male householder with no wife present, and 50.0% were non-families. 40.0% of all households were made up of individuals, and 5% had someone living alone who was 65 years of age or older. The average household size was 2.10 and the average family size was 2.80.

The median age in the city was 39 years. 21.4% of residents were under the age of 18; 0.0% were between the ages of 18 and 24; 30.9% were from 25 to 44; 28.4% were from 45 to 64; and 19% were 65 years of age or older. The gender makeup of the city was 54.8% male and 45.2% female.

2000 census
As of the census of 2000, there were 42 people, 26 households, and 12 families residing in the city. The population density was 260.8 people per square mile (100.0/km2). There were 31 housing units at an average density of 141.8 per square mile (54.4/km2). The racial makeup of the city was 100.00% White.

There were 26 households, out of which 26.9% had children under the age of 18 living with them, 38.5% were married couples living together, 3.8% had a female householder with no husband present, and 53.8% were non-families. 53.8% of all households were made up of individuals, and 30.8% had someone living alone who was 65 years of age or older. The average household size was 2.19 and the average family size was 3.50.

In the city, the population was spread out, with 17.5% under the age of 18, 14.0% from 18 to 24, 21.1% from 25 to 44, 29.8% from 45 to 64, and 17.5% who were 65 years of age or older. The median age was 43 years. For every 100 females, there were 119.2 males. For every 100 females age 18 and over, there were 104.3 males.

The median income for a household in the city was $18,500, and the median income for a family was $23,750. Males had a median income of $28,333 versus $11,250 for females. The per capita income for the city was $10,547. There were 50.0% of families and 39.0% of the population living below the poverty line, including 16.7% of under eighteens and none of those over 64.

References

Cities in North Dakota
Cities in LaMoure County, North Dakota
Populated places established in 1885